This covers all the results and statistics for the Brisbane Lions in the 2010 AFL season.

2009 off-season 

The Lions lost in their semi-final clash against the Western Bulldogs at the Melbourne Cricket Ground by 51 points. It was the last game for veteran Tim Notting, who announced his retirement almost a week from the match. Michael Voss was desperate to make some changes to the playing list. The Lions secured three players on the first day of the 2009 AFL Trade Week. In a separate trade on the same day, 's Andrew Raines joined the Lions. The Lions continued to be active in the trade week and on the fourth day they secured 's Xavier Clarke. On the final day of Trade Week, Fevola was traded to the Lions for Lachlan Henderson. Daniel Bradshaw and Michael Rischitelli originally were put up trade for Fevola but the deal fell through after Rischitelli declined. Bradshaw was incensed at being put up for trade and eventually quit the Lions.

With one of the best team rosters ahead of the 2010 season, Brisbane were expected to once again make the finals. Four straight wins saw them on top of the ladder after round four, but from there the Lions went into freefall winning only three more games for the season.

Squad for 2010
Statistics are correct as of start of 2010 season.

Player changes for 2010

In

Out

Ladder

Results

NAB Cup

First Round

NAB Challenge

Week 2

Week 3

Week 4

Premiership season

Round 1

Round 2

Round 3

Round 4

Round 5

Round 6

Round 7

Round 8

Round 9

Round 10

Round 11

Round 12

Round 13

Round 14

Round 15

Round 16

Round 17

Round 18

Round 19

Round 20

Round 21

Round 22

Exhibition Match

Milestones

References

Notes

External links 
 Official Brisbane Lions website
 Official AFL Website
 

Brisbane Lions
2010
Brisbane Lions